The Pleasant Street Historic District in Gainesville, Florida is a U.S. historic district (designated as such on April 20, 1989) located in Gainesville, Florida. It contains 259 historic buildings.

History
Pleasant Street is one of Gainesville's early African American settlements, along with Porter's Quarters.

References

External links
 Florida's Office of Cultural and Historical Programs - Alachua County
 Historic Markers in Alachua County

Geography of Gainesville, Florida
National Register of Historic Places in Gainesville, Florida
Historic districts on the National Register of Historic Places in Florida
Tourist attractions in Gainesville, Florida